Max Apple (born October 22, 1941) is an American short story writer, novelist, and professor at The University of Pennsylvania in Philadelphia, Pennsylvania.

Biography 
Apple was born to a Jewish family in Grand Rapids, Michigan, and received his B.A. (1963) and Ph.D (1970) from the University of Michigan. Apple taught creative writing at Rice University in Houston, Texas, for 29 years, where he held the Fox Chair in English. After retiring from Rice University, Apple moved to Philadelphia, where he teaches at The University of Pennsylvania. Along with his published novels and short story collections, he wrote the screenplays for Smokey Bites the Dust, The Air Up There, and Roommates (based on his 1994 biography Roommates: My Grandfather's Story).

Bibliography 

 The Oranging of America and Other Stories (1976)
 Zip: A Novel of the Left and the Right (1978)
 Free Agents (1984) 
 The Propheteers (1987) 
 Roommates: My Grandfather's Story  (1994) 
 I Love Gootie: My Grandmother's Story (1998) 
 The Jew of Home Depot and Other Stories (Johns Hopkins University Press, 2007)

See also 
 History of the Jews in Houston

Notes

References

External links 
 An Interview with Writer Max Apple

1941 births
20th-century American novelists
20th-century American male writers
American male screenwriters
Jewish American writers
Rice University faculty
University of Michigan alumni
University of Pennsylvania faculty
Living people
Pew Fellows in the Arts
American male novelists
American male short story writers
Writers from Grand Rapids, Michigan
20th-century American short story writers
Novelists from Pennsylvania
Novelists from Texas
Novelists from Michigan
21st-century American Jews